Gusano roughly translates to worm in Spanish and may refer to:
 Los Gusanos, a band formed in 1992 by C. J. Ramone
 Gusanos, a clone project of Liero
 de gusano, a subtype of mezcal
 Gusano, a pejorative term first used by Fidel Castro towards Cuban counter-revolutionaries; see

See also
 Day of the Gusano: Live in Mexico, an album by Slipknot